Chez may refer to:

 Anthony Chez (1872-1937), American football, basketball, and baseball coach and college athletics administrator
 Chez Reavie (born 1981), American golfer
 Chez Hotels, an American chain of franchised hotels
 CHEZ-FM, a Canadian radio station
 Chez Scheme, an implementation of the Scheme programming language

See also 
Ches (disambiguation)
Shez (disambiguation)